Stenoptilia pallistriga is a moth of the family Pterophoridae described by William Barnes and James Halliday McDunnough in 1913. It is known from Dominica, Ecuador, Jamaica, Paraguay and Suriname. It is also found in the United States in Florida and Mississippi.

The wingspan is 14–16 mm. Adults are on wing from February to June, from August to October and in December.

References

External links

Annotated Checklist of the Pterophoridae (Lepidoptera) of Florida including Larval Food Plant Records

Moths described in 1913
pallistriga
Moths of North America
Moths of South America
Taxa named by William Barnes (entomologist)
Taxa named by James Halliday McDunnough